Jean Labatut may refer to:

 Jean Labatut (architect)
 Jean Labatut (sport shooter)